Henry Gordon Cowans (born 1 October 1996) is an English footballer who plays as a midfielder for Cymru Premier club Newtown. Cowans is a product of the Aston Villa Academy and has previously played for Stevenage and Telford United.

Club career

Aston Villa and Stevenage
Cowans joined Aston Villa as a child, his father, Gordon Cowans, had a long association with the club and was a youth coach at the club when his son signed his first youth terms in 2012. 

On 24 August 2016, Cowans joined Stevenage  of EFL League Two on loan until January 2017. Cowans was named on the bench for Stevenage on 27 August 2016 and given the number 23 shirt but did not start in a 5–2 away loss. He made his professional debut in an EFL Trophy loss to Leyton Orient four days later. On 9 January 2017, Cowans had his loan extended until the end of the season.

Cowans was a regular for the under-18, under-21 and under-23 sides but never made a senior first team appearance and was released in June 2017.

Telford
On 4 September 2017 Cowans joined A.F.C. Telford United of the National League North. He made 31 total appearances over the season, and scored his first senior goal on 11 November in a 3–1 loss at F.C. United of Manchester.

On 7 March 2019 A.F.C. Telford United confirmed, that Cowans had joined Stratford Town on loan until the end of the season. However, he was recalled early. On 9 December 2019, he was loaned out again, this time to Stourbridge until 6 January 2020. 

On 3 August 2021, Cowans was announced to have left Telford.

Newtown
In September 2021, Cowans joined Cymru Premier club Newtown. It took until 10 December 2021 for Cowans to make his debut, due to the injury problems which had blighted his Telford career, he played the final 9 minutes of a 4–2 away victory over Aberystwyth Town. Cowans went on to make 12 appearances in his first season in Wales, including 8 starts. On 14 July 2022, Cowans scored his first goal for Newtown in the UEFA Europa Conference League against Havnar Bóltfelag.

Career statistics

References

1996 births
Living people
Footballers from Birmingham, West Midlands
Aston Villa F.C. players
Stevenage F.C. players
AFC Telford United players
Stratford Town F.C. players
Stourbridge F.C. players
Newtown A.F.C. players
English footballers
Association football midfielders
English Football League players
National League (English football) players
Cymru Premier players